General elections were held in Samoa on 4 March 2016 to determine the composition of the 16th Parliament. Two parties contested the election, the ruling Human Rights Protection Party (HRPP), led by prime minister Tuilaʻepa Saʻilele Malielegaoi which had governed since 1982 and the Tautua Samoa Party, led by opposition leader Palusalue Faʻapo II.

The election was held following the passage of electoral reforms, including the implementation of a parliamentary women's quota that requires the legislature to have at least five female members. Parliament also introduced electoral boundary changes in 2015, which saw the abolition of the six double-member constituencies and the individual voters' seats, the constituents of the latter included voters with partial or no Samoan ancestry and individuals not connected to a traditional village.

The HRPP won a landslide re-election, securing 35 seats; although several cabinet ministers lost their seats. The TSP suffered a significant loss and retained only two seats, down from 13 in the 2011 election, and the party's leader was among those unseated. Only four female candidates were successful, resulting in the appointment of an additional female member to fulfil the women's quota, which increased parliament's seat count to 50. Following the election, 12 independents joined the HRPP, which increased the party's seats to 47 and preserved the ruling party's dominance over Samoan politics. The TSP was joined by one independent, increasing the party's seat share to three. Because the TSP failed to win at least eight seats, it lost recognition as a parliamentary party, which left Samoa without an official opposition.

Background 
During the previous election held in 2011, the HRPP, which had governed since 1982 and had also dominated Samoa politics since then, won re-election, securing 29 seats. The newly founded opposition Tautua Samoa Party secured 13 seats, and independents won the remaining seven. Following that election, all independents joined the HRPP, while several individuals lost their seats due to electoral petitions. One of these MPs was Tautua Samoa leader Va'ai Papu Vailupe; he was subsequently replaced as leader by deputy leader Palusalue Fa'apo II.

TSP defections 

Olo Fiti Vaai (then known as Levaopolo Talatonu Vaai) resigned from the party in November 2015 to found a new opposition party. However, he announced that he would contest the 2016 election as an independent. 

In February 2016, the TSP's chief whip and founder, Lealailepule Rimoni Aiafi, defected to the HRPP, citing a request to do so by his constituents of Faleata West. Although Palusalue respected Lealailepule's decision, he was skeptical about the justification for the switch. Palusalue expressed, "he (Lealailepule) says it’s what his constituency wants, but we all understand that decisions on which political party you choose is not up to your constituency because you cannot call the whole Faleata West constituency to meet and decide this." Tuilaʻepa believed that Lealailepule's defection and his status as a founder of the TSP provided the opposition with a significant disadvantage.

Electoral system 

The 49 members of the legislative assembly were elected from 49 single-member constituencies. All seats were elected using first-past-the-post voting. Candidates were required to be at least 21 years of age, be a Matai and resident of the country for at least three years prior the nomination date. Civil servants and people with mental illness were ineligible to stand as candidates. People convicted for bribery or an electoral offense, and people given a prison sentence of more than two years (including the death sentence), were also ineligible. Around 116,000 electors were registered for the election. The Constitution Amendment Act 2013 ensures a minimum of 10 per cent of seats in parliament were reserved for women.

Electoral reforms 

In 2013 a constitutional amendment was passed in parliament, mandating that at least five members of the legislative assembly are women. If this quota were unfulfilled following an election, the amendment permits parliament to establish up to five additional seats that would be allocated to the unsuccessful female candidates with the highest quantity of votes.

Parliament passed legislation in 2014 barring candidates from providing gifts to villages within their constituency until after an election in an attempt to stamp out undue influence and prevent excessive electoral petitions that follow. Parliamentary hopefuls had traditionally presented gifts to potential voters upon declaring their candidacy.

Electoral boundary changes 

The legislative assembly introduced constituency boundary changes in 2015. The six double-member constituencies were split into twelve constituencies, each represented by one member of parliament. The reform also abolished the two individual voters seats, that were for voters with partial or no Samoan ancestry or citizens that had no ties to any traditional village. The Urban East and Urban West constituencies replaced the individual seats, and consisted of voters in Apia residing on non-customary land or those not tied to a traditional village. Individuals living in Apia who did have ties to a traditional village outside the capital could choose to either enrol in their home constituency or one of the urban electorates so long as they had lived in Apia for at least six months. The creation of the urban electorates resulted from voters from traditional villages around Apia expressing discontent with urban settlers allegedly having an overbearing influence over the electoral outcome in their constituencies. The abolition of the double-member seats reduced an imbalance of representation to a certain extent, as voters in these electorates were permitted to cast two votes. However, some constituencies remained disproportionately larger than others.

Voters 

Enrollment of eligible voters was compulsory; however, it was voluntary to cast a ballot. Universal suffrage was introduced in 1990, permitting Samoan citizens over the age of 21 to vote in person. Voting registration usually closes six months before a general election and re-opens immediately after. Voters could elect to enrol in a constituency rather than the one where they reside by right of significant family ties or matai titles. As a result, the population of constituencies and the constituency's voter roll have not always correlated. Samoan citizens residing abroad were permitted to register, but the government refused to entertain overseas voting. Therefore, voters abroad had to travel to Samoa to cast their ballots. This decision drew criticism from the opposition TSP, which demanded the government permit overseas voting. Prime minister Tuilaʻepa defended his government's decision and dismissed the opposition's pleas as a "foolish tactic" that would lead to the country "...being governed by overseas Samoans".

Schedule 

The election date was revealed in September 2015, and voter registration closed on 31 October of that year. The dissolution of parliament occurred on 29 January 2016, and the writ for the election was issued on 5 February. On the same day, the registration process for candidates opened and remained so until 18 February. The government declared 3 and 4 March to be a general election holiday. The return of writs occurred on 14 March.

Parties and candidates 

A total of 171 candidates were nominated. Five were subsequently disqualified and two withdrew, which resulted in 164 candidates contesting the election. There were 24 female candidates, up from nine in the 2011 election. Two parties contested the election, the ruling HRPP led by prime minister Tuilaʻepa Saʻilele Malielegaoi and the TSP led by opposition leader Palusalue Fa‘apo II. The HRPP fielded 81 candidates; the TSP 22 and 61 contenders ran as independents. However, 48 of the independents were associated with the HRPP and one was aligned with the TSP. The high quantity of Independents affiliated with the HRPP was due to the ruling party's policy of prioritising its incumbent members of parliament. In addition to four constituencies where the sole candidate was an HRPP member, candidates in 14 other constituencies solely consisted of hopefuls that were either a member of the HRPP or an affiliate of the party. Therefore, the HRPP was guaranteed to secure 18 seats.

Campaign

The HRPP released its manifesto in February 2016. The party promised to implement numerous developments, including an increase in employment, particularly amongst the youth, by bolstering apprenticeship and vocational training schemes to improve the rates of business establishment. Education was also a high priority for the party during the campaign. The HRPP pledged to extend the age of compulsory education from 14 to 17 years and to proceed with constructing schools throughout the country. The party also announced plans for healthcare development through a "Healthy Samoa" initiative. This plan included a boost in training health professionals, upgrading healthcare facilities and encouraging robust lifestyles via exercise throughout the country. Infrastructure development would continue under an additional term of the HRPP rule, including water sanitation, as would the party's efforts to combat climate change. 
During the campaign, prime minister Tuilaʻepa attacked the TSP's proposals, describing them as "weak" and "lacking substance." He also claimed, "The biggest issue I see is that they are copying our ideas" and asserted that his government's plans were "solid" because they did not "…take guesses" when planning projects. Tuilaʻepa also questioned how the TSP would fund their initiatives.

The Tautua Samoa Party, which released its manifesto in January 2016, promised to raise the minimum wage from WS$2.30 to WS$3.00 per hour. Party leader Palusalue Faʻapo II argued that the HRPP government's 'boasting' about the country's WS$2 billion GDP 'did not reflect positively on the minimum wage'. The Samoa First Union applauded the minimum wage increase proposal, with the union's coordinator describing it as a "win-win for Samoa". The party also announced its intention to increase the retirement pension from WS$125 to WS$250 per month. Regarding the youth, the TSP pledged to introduce universal education, establish a branch of the National University of Samoa in Savaiʻi to serve students there and implement fees-free health care for children, including prescriptions without charge. Palusalue announced that the TSP would finance these initiatives by reversing the government's "reckless spending" on "failed development projects". He said these actions had been the cause of an increase in Samoa's foreign debt of over one billion tālā. The TSP declined to raise taxes. The party also vowed to abolish the three-year residency requirement that candidates must satisfy to be eligible to contest an election. Palusalue stated, "We are committed to implement these measures so that everyone has an equal chance at having a good life. Our people in Samoa deserve this; we owe it to them to deliver."

Capital Radio Samoa predicted that the ruling party would win the elections.

Conduct 

Voting commenced at 8am (UTC+14:00), most polling stations closed at 15:00, while special voting booths remained open until 17:00. A liquor ban was imposed with effect from the voting day and till 06:00 the next morning. No violence was reported during the voting.

The Pacific Islands Forum and the Australian National University sent delegations to observe the electoral process.

In previous elections, candidates would directly provide transport for voters seeking to travel to polling stations. However, the government banned this practice before the election to reduce undue influence. But this law proved problematic for voters residing in rural or remote areas, as public transport was not in service, as election day and the day prior were public holidays. Although some candidates hired taxis for voters, the lack of available transportation resulted in a lower turnout than in previous elections.

Results 

The provisional results showed the HRPP leading with 47 seats out of a maximum of 49. In the official tally, the HRPP won re-election in a landslide with 35 seats, while the TSP only secured two seats. Four HRPP candidates, including prime minister Tuilaʻepa and justice minister Fiamē Naomi Mata’afa, were elected unopposed. TSP leader Palusalue Faʻapo II lost his seat, and the party's only successful candidates were deputy leader A'eau Peniamina and newcomer Ili Setefano Taʻateo. Because the TSP's seat total fell below the eight-member threshold, it lost recognition as a parliamentary party. Independents won the remaining 13 seats. Despite the ruling party's victory, several cabinet ministers lost re-election and half of the elected MPs were newcomers. Four women MPs were elected and a fifth, the unsuccessful female candidate with the highest percentage of votes, was added to meet the quota requirements of 10% female MPs. Independent Fa'aulusau Rosa Duffy-Stowers, who placed second in the Gaga'ifomauga No. 3 constituency, was selected increasing the parliament's strength to 50 members. The result ensured a continuation of the HRPP's dominance over Samoan politics.

By constituency

Uncontested
The following candidates were elected unopposed:

Aftermath

After the election, 12 of the 13 independents joined the HRPP. The only independent who did not follow suit was Olo Fiti Vaai, who expressed that he was "saddened" by the TSP's overwhelming loss. He instead opted to rejoin the TSP, claiming to have rejected multiple offers to join the HRPP. At the first convention of the 16th parliament, the HRPP caucus was 47 members strong, while the TSP had three members.

Prime minister Tuilaʻepa thanked the citizens for "the overwhelming vote of confidence in our vision for [Samoa]". He credited his party's landslide victory to its ‘ability to deliver on its promises.’ He also proclaimed that the most pressing issue to be dealt with by his government in its next term was climate change. Tuilaʻepa denied claims that his government had evolved into a dictatorship and pointed to a speech he presented in Savaiʻi during the campaign season to HRPP candidates warning them not to seek election to the legislative assembly if they only intend to use their office for "personal gains". The prime minister also highlighted institutions such as the ministry of police and prisons, the ombudsman's office and the office of the auditor as mechanisms to prevent government corruption. The HRPP celebrated its electoral triumph by holding a traditional ʻAva ceremony. On 5 March, the HRPP elected long-serving cabinet minister Fiamē Naomi Mataʻafa deputy leader. She defeated fellow veteran HRPP member Faumuina Tiatia Liuga by a caucus vote of 21 to 19.

Palusalue congratulated the prime minister and the HRPP but also expressed that the result surprised the TSP. He said, "The truth is I’m extremely disappointed. As a party, the result is not what we expected, and we are very sad...". The TSP leader said the absence of an official opposition did not bode well for Samoa and made the country a "one-party state". Palusalue blamed the Tautua Samoa Party’s landslide loss on vote-buying. The former shadow minister of finance Afualo Wood Salele shared this sentiment, claiming that candidates offered bags of rice and other foods to voters. The prime minister rejected the TSP's allegations, stating, "You see the first person that claims they did not do wrong is the very person that did wrong", and highlighted an amendment parliament passed before the election that imposed a strict ban on bribery. Tuila'epa claimed the TSP's downfall was due to negligence in leadership and an unfavourable campaign strategy. MP Olo Fiti Vaai requested that the HRPP consider lowering the seat quota for parties to attain recognition in parliament; members of the ruling party echoed this statement. Palusalue also criticised the policy and stated, "In any democracy, there has to be an opposition party. In my opinion, the number of members should be irrelevant. There must still be a recognised opposition party." With the absence of an official opposition, Tuilaʻepa instructed 19 HRPP caucus members who were not appointed associate ministers to play the role of the opposition along with the Tautua Samoa MPs. Palusalue ceased to be the TSP leader following his defeat, and the party did not elect a successor.

Prime minister Tuilaʻepa appointed seven new cabinet ministers. Although re-elected to parliament, deputy prime minister Fonotoe Pierre Lauofo was not reappointed to cabinet; he was previously fined for traffic offences in 2014. Fonotoe was replaced by Fiamē Naomi Mataʻafa, who became Samoa's first female deputy prime minister.

The O le Ao o le Malo, Tui Ātua Tupua Tamasese Efi, officially opened the 16th parliamentary session on 18 March 2016.

Notes

See also
List of members of the Legislative Assembly of Samoa (2016–2021)

References

Samoa
General
Elections in Samoa